François Lanusse (3 November 1772 – 21 March 1801) was a French general of division of the Revolutionary Wars. He was killed at the battle of Canope on 21 March 1801, during the Egyptian campaign. Lanusse was the general of the French army in the Battle of Mandora.

1722 births
1801 deaths
French generals
French Republican military leaders of the French Revolutionary Wars
Names inscribed under the Arc de Triomphe